Brute de femme is the second album of Diam's, released in 2003. This album won the Victoires de la musique (Music's Victories) for the Album rap, hip-hop de l’année (Rap/hip-hop album of the year).

Track listing
 "Intro"
 "Incassables"
 "Mon Répertoire"
 "Cruelle A Vie"
 "Dj"(sample of ¿Quién será?)
 "Madame Qui ?"
 "1980"
 "Où Je Vais"
 "Vénus"
 "Ma Souffrance"
 "Èvasion"
 "Amoré"
 "Daddy"
 "Parce Que"
 "Suzy 2003"

Charts

Certifications

References

Diam's albums
2003 albums